The 2014–15 season was AaB's 32nd consecutive season in the top flight of Danish football, 25th consecutive season in the Danish Superliga, and 129th year in existence as a football club. AaB participated in the Champions League this season, coming in 1st place in the 2013–14 Danish Superliga.

Month by month review

Club

Coaching staff 

{| class="wikitable"
!Position
!Staff
|-
|Head Coach|| Kent Nielsen
|-
|Assistant coach|| Allan Kuhn
|-
|Development Manager – AaB Fodbold|| Poul Erik Andreasen
|-
|Goalkeeping coach|| Poul Buus
|-
|Team Leader|| Ernst Damborg
|-
|Doctor|| Søren Kaalund
|-
|Physiotherapist|| Morten Skjoldager
|-
|Physical trainer|| Ashley Tootle
|-
|Sports Psychology consultant|| Martin Langagergaard
|-
|U/19 League coach|| Jacob Friis
|-
|U/17 League coach|| Lars Knudsen
|-

Other information 

|-

First team squad 

As of 8 March 2015

Source: AaB Fodbold website

Transfers and loans

In

Summer

Winter

Out

Summer

Winter

Loan in

Loan out

Overall transfer activity

Spending 

Summer:  £0

Winter:  £0

Total:  £0

Income 

Summer:  £0

Winter:  £0

Total:  £0

Expenditure 

Summer:  £0

Winter:  £0

Total:  £0

Friendlies

Pre-season

Mid-season

Competitions

Competition record

Danish Superliga

League table

Results summary

Results by round

Matches

Danish Cup 

Notes
Note 1: Due to inadequate lightning facilities at Odder IGF's home ground, Spektrum Park, the match was relocated to Nordjyske Arena, Aalborg.

UEFA Champions League

Qualifying phase and play-off round

Third qualifying round

Play-off round

UEFA Europa League

Group stage

Table

Matches

Knockout phase

Round of 32

Statistics

Appearances 

This includes all competitive matches. The list is sorted by shirt number when total appearances are equal.

Goalscorers 

This includes all competitive matches. The list is sorted by shirt number when total goals are equal.

Assists 

This includes all competitive matches. The list is sorted by shirt number when total assists are equal.

Clean sheets 

This includes all competitive matches. The list is sorted by shirt number when total clean sheets are equal.

Disciplinary record 

This includes all competitive matches. The list is sorted by shirt number when total cards are equal.

Summary

Awards

Individual

Team

References 

2014-15
Danish football clubs 2014–15 season
2014–15 UEFA Champions League participants seasons